The arpeggione is a six-stringed musical instrument fretted and tuned like a guitar, but with a curved bridge so it can be bowed like a cello, and thus similar to the bass viola da gamba. The instrument is sometimes also called a guitar violoncello.<ref name="arpeggione">{{Cite web |title=Arpeggione]arpeggione |url=http://www.oxfordmusiconline.com/subscriber/article/grove/music/01328. |access-date=15 September 2016 |website=oxford music online}}</ref> The body shape of the arpeggione is, however, more similar to a medieval fiddle than either the guitar or the bass viol. It is essentially a bass viol with a guitar-type tuning, E–A–d–g–b–e' . The arpeggione is especially suited to playing runs in thirds, double stops, and arpeggios.

It enjoyed a brief period of popularity for perhaps a decade after its invention around 1823, by the Viennese instrument luthiers Johann Georg Stauffer and Peter Teufelsdorfer. The only notable extant piece for the arpeggione is a sonata with piano accompaniment by Franz Schubert, D.821, not published until 1871, when the instrument was long out of vogue. This sonata is now commonly played on the cello or viola, and many other instruments have received transcriptions as well.

In the 21st century, a revival of interest in the arpeggione has led to the composition of a number of new works either for the instrument alone or within an ensemble.

Composers who have written the largest number of works include the American Dov Joshua Rosenschein, France's Grégory Guéant, and René Mogensen from Denmark.

Contemporary designs of viol-like instruments have similarities to the arpeggione, and at least one (the GuitarViol) was directly influenced by Stauffer's arpeggione.

References

 Aquino, F. Avellar de. "Six-Stringed Virtuoso". The Strad Magazine, Harrow, Middlesex, UK, v. 109, n. 1297, p. 500–507, May 1998. About the arpeggione and Schubert's Sonata.
 Geiringer, Karl.  "Schubert's Arpeggione Sonata and the 'Super Arpeggione'."  "Musical Quarterly", 65, no. 4 (Oct. 1979), pp. 513–523.
 Sadie, Stanley, ed., The New Grove Dictionary of Music and Musicians, vol. 16, 6th. ed., London: Macmillan Press Limited, 1980. s.v. "Schubert, Franz" by Maurice J. E. Brown.
 Schuster, Vincenz.  "Anleitung zur Erlernung des . . . neu erfundenen Guitarre-Violoncells".  Vienna: Diabelli.
 Tree, Michael, "Schubert’s Arpeggione Sonata". The Strad Magazine'', vol. 105, February 1994, p. 142. Master-Class on Schubert's Sonata.

External links
 Nicolas Deletaille's webpage on the arpeggione, a lot of useful information on the arpeggione. (The last fairly trouble-free archive version of this page is at Archive of Nicolas Deletaille's webpage on the arpeggione.)
 Homepage of the "Arpeggione World". Osamu Okumura, Japanese has restored OK-model and Anton Mitteisーmodel of Arpeggione making by himself.
 Photo

Guitar family instruments
Bowed string instruments
Chamber music